Michelle Beaudoin (born August 25, 1975) is a Canadian actress best known for her roles as Jenny Kelley in the sitcom Sabrina, the Teenage Witch and Penny Foster in the teen drama Madison.

Career
Beaudoin played Sabrina's best friend Marnie in the Sabrina the Teenage Witch movie, and Sabrina's best friend Jenny Kelley in the first season of the series. Apart from Melissa Joan Hart, Beaudoin was the only other original cast member from the film that went on to the Sabrina the Teenage Witch television series. Beaudoin's character was removed from the series after only one season.  The show's star Melissa Joan Hart said characters left, because of the backstage drama, such as audience reaction and payments for actors and the writers who created the characters.

Beaudoin had earlier starred as Penny Foster in the Canadian teen drama series Madison, which earned her a 1994 Gemini Awards nomination for "Best Performance in a Children's or Youth Program or Series".

Beaudoin has also guest-starred in many popular television series including Da Vinci's Inquest and The Outer Limits as well as several independent films such as Waydowntown, Ginger Snaps 2: Unleashed, Sweetwater and Sunset Strip.

Filmography

Awards and nominations

References

External links 
 

1975 births
Living people
Actresses from Edmonton
Canadian film actresses
Canadian television actresses
Franco-Albertan people